Louis Michael Iribarne (September 1940 - 5 December 2020) was a Canadian translator of Polish into English. He translated works by Witold Gombrowicz, Stanisław Lem, Czesław Miłosz, Bruno Schulz and Stanisław Ignacy Witkiewicz. He also taught Polish and Russian literature at the University of Toronto, where he retired in 1998.

Bibliography
Louis Iribarne, "Babel's 'Red Cavalry' as a Baroque Novel," Contemporary Literature, vol. 14, no. 1 (winter, 1973), University of Wisconsin Press, pp. 58–77. 
Stanisław Lem, The Chain of Chance, translated from the Polish by Louis Iribarne, Evanston, Illinois, Northwestern University Press, 1975.
Czesław Miłosz, The Issa Valley, translated from the Polish by Louis Iribarne, New York, Farrar Straus Giroux,1981.
Stanisław Ignacy Witkiewicz, Insatiability, translated by Louis Iribarne, Evanston, Illinois, Northwestern University Press, 1996.
Czesław Miłosz, The Land of Ulro, translated by Louis Iribarne, Farrar, Straus and Giroux Paperbacks, May 2000.

References

1940 births
2020 deaths
Polish–English translators
Translators of Stanisław Lem